David Cremin (born 22 February 1930) is a Roman Catholic Bishop Emeritus of the Roman Catholic Archdiocese of Sydney.  He was born in Ballydoorty, County Limerick, Ireland. He was taught by the Jesuits in Limerick, and attended the Seminary of All Hallows College in Dublin. He was ordained a priest on 12 June 1955 by John Joseph Scanlan.  On 25 October 1973 he was appointed Titular Bishop of Cunga Féichin and Auxiliary Bishop of his home diocese.  He was ordained a bishop on 19 January 1974.  The Principal Consecrator was Cardinal James Darcy Freeman; his Principal Co-Consecrators were James Knox and Bishop Thomas Cahill.  He retired from his post on 22 February 2005.

References

Clergy from County Limerick
1930 births
Living people
Alumni of All Hallows College, Dublin
20th-century Roman Catholic bishops in Australia
20th-century Roman Catholic titular bishops
21st-century Roman Catholic bishops in Australia
Roman Catholic bishops of Sydney
Irish emigrants to Australia